Vitālijs Teplovs (born 20 March 1970) is a retired Latvian football striker.

References

1971 births
Living people
Latvian footballers
FK Liepājas Metalurgs players
FK RFS players
K.F.C. Diest players
FC Neftekhimik Nizhnekamsk players
Sliema Wanderers F.C. players
Dinaburg FC players
FC TVMK players
Association football forwards
Latvian expatriate footballers
Expatriate footballers in Belgium
Latvian expatriate sportspeople in Belgium
Expatriate footballers in Germany
Latvian expatriate sportspeople in Germany
Expatriate footballers in Russia
Latvian expatriate sportspeople in Russia
Expatriate footballers in Malta
Latvian expatriate sportspeople in Malta
Expatriate footballers in Estonia
Latvian expatriate sportspeople in Estonia
Latvia international footballers